Derek Gillespie (born 6 July 1978) is a Canadian professional golfer who has played on the Canadian Tour, where he has won twice and the Web.com Tour.

Early life
Gillespie was born in Oshawa, Ontario. He was a heralded junior golfer in Canada, playing in the 1995 and 1996 Canadian Junior National Teams and was named the top Canadian golfer for those two years.  He attended the University of Arizona and was the only freshman to play in every tournament. His teammates included Rory Sabbatini and Camilo Villegas' caddie Gary Mathwes. He was named to the Pac-10 Conference Team twice and inducted into the University of Arizona Golf Hall of Fame in 2000. He turned professional later that year during the week of the Bell Canadian Open.

Professional career
Gillespie started playing events on the Canadian Tour in 2002 but did not find immediate success. He won two events there, the most recent in 2003 at the Corona Ixtapa Classic by 8 strokes. He missed getting to the final stage of PGA Tour qualifying school in 2006 and considered quitting his golf career. He then re-dedicated himself and made 13 of 14 cuts on the Canadian Tour in 2007, with three 2nd place finishes and a 3rd place finish on the Order of Merit. He has made only 1 of 4 cuts on the Canadian Tour in 2008.

He won The Big Break Prince Edward Island, a golf reality television show on the Golf Channel.

Gillespie played on the Web.com Tour in 2014 after earning his tour card through qualifying school.

Amateur highlights
1995/96 Canadian Junior National Teams
2000 Pac-10 Conference Team at University of Arizona

Professional wins (3)

Canadian Tour wins (2)

Other wins (1)
2016 Quebec Open

Team appearances
Amateur
Eisenhower Trophy (representing Canada): 2000

References

External links

Canadian male golfers
Arizona Wildcats men's golfers
Golfing people from Ontario
Sportspeople from Oshawa
1978 births
Living people